Ivy Academia is a public charter school in Los Angeles, California, United States, that specializes in education for the business world. The school has two campuses: the Woodland Hills campus takes students from transitional kindergarten through 5th grade while the other in West Hills is from 6th grade through 12th grade. Their mascot is a Puma and their executive director is Joe Herzog. Enrollment for the year 2014-2015 was 952 and all 48 teachers were appropriately assigned and fully credentialed in the subject area and for the students they were teaching. 93% of the class of 2014 graduated. Ivy Academia will be getting a new campus sharing campuses near the Shoup park.

Legal issues
On 5 April 2013, the founders of Ivy Academia Charter School were found guilty of embezzling $200,000 of public funds. Yevgeny Selivanov was sentenced to nearly five years in state prison, while his wife, Tatyana Berkovich, was sentenced to serve 45 days in county jail, perform 320 hours of community service and five years of probation. They had held positions as executive director, principal and president, but were placed on administrative leave in 2010 and resigned in 2011.

In 2016 the Los Angeles Unified School District was ordered to pay the school $7.1 million for failing to provide the school with rent-free classroom space.

References

External links

Charter K-12 schools in California
Education in California